Robert Andrykowski (born March 1, 1961) is an American country music artist who records under the name Davis Daniel. Between 1991 and 1996, he recorded three studio albums on various divisions of Mercury Records: 1991's Fighting Fire with Fire, 1994's Davis Daniel, and 1995's I Know a Place. In that same time span, seven of his singles entered the Billboard Hot Country Singles & Tracks (now Hot Country Songs) charts, including the Top 40 hits "Picture Me", "For Crying Out Loud" and "Fighting Fire with Fire."

Biography
Robert Andrykowski was born in Arlington Heights, Illinois, on March 1, 1961. Over time, his family moved to Nebraska, and subsequently to Denver, Colorado.

As a teenager, he found work singing at various nightclubs throughout Denver, Colorado. By the late 1980s, he moved to Nashville, Tennessee, eventually adopting the stage name Davis Daniel and landing a record deal with Mercury/Polygram Records in 1991 with the help of his music producer Ron Haffkine.

Fighting Fire with Fire was issued that year. It produced four singles on the country charts: "Picture Me" at number 28, followed by "For Crying Out Loud" at number 13, the title track at number 27 and "Still Got a Crush on You" at number 48. Alanna Nash of Entertainment Weekly gave the album a B rating, comparing Daniel's vocal technique to that of Keith Whitley and saying that he showed promise in carrying on in Whitley's tradition.

Daniel's second album, the self-titled Davis Daniel, followed in 1994 on Polydor Records. Its singles, "I Miss Her Missing Me," "William and Mary" and "Tyler," all peaked outside the top 40 in the United States, although "Tyler" reached number 39 on the RPM charts in Canada. "I Miss Her Missing Me" had been released by Mercury, which had originally planned to release the album in 1993 under the title Undeniable before Mercury underwent a management change that resulted in Daniel moving to Polydor. Cub Koda of Allmusic gave the album three stars out of five, saying, "there's enough good stuff here to make you think that he might develop into something more than a one-shot artist." New Country magazine's Michael McCall gave the album two-and-a-half stars out of five, praising the lyrics of "Tyler" and "Out Here Sits the King", but criticizing the other songs for lacking substance.

For his third album, Daniel moved to A&M Records. This album, I Know a Place, was released in 1996. Its lead-off single "I'm Not Listening Anymore" was part of a "Mystery Artist" contest on Country Music Television (CMT), which showed two versions of the song's music video: one where Daniel's face was obscured, and another where it was shown plainly. This single did not enter the charts.

After his third album, Daniel mostly stayed at home with his wife, Julie, and children Tyler and Alexa. He resumed touring in 2001 with a band called Big Heart, and released a new single called "Is It Just Me?"

Discography

Albums

Singles

Music videos

References

1961 births
American country singer-songwriters
Singer-songwriters from Illinois
Living people
People from Arlington Heights, Illinois
Mercury Records artists
Polydor Records artists
A&M Records artists
Country musicians from Illinois
American male singer-songwriters